The Fifth Alaska State Legislature served from January 23, 1967, to January 26, 1969.

The Alaska Legislature had largely been controlled by the Democratic Party since statehood took effect in 1959, as was the case with most territorial legislatures stretching as far back as the early 1930s.  In the 1966 elections, Alaska followed the rest of the nation and voted Republican: incumbent governor William A. Egan and incumbent U.S. Representative Ralph J. Rivers both lost reelection to Republican challengers (Walter J. Hickel and Howard W. Pollock, respectively).  Republicans also wound up with control of both houses of the legislature, though many of the Republicans newly elected in 1966 only served in this legislature.

This Senate saw major changes in its composition.  In response to the "one man, one vote" decision of the United States Supreme Court in Reynolds v. Sims, the area-based apportionment scheme established for the Senate in the state constitution was abandoned, and the Senate was apportioned strictly on a population basis like the House.  Jay Hammond, who served in the House in the first three legislatures before returning home to Naknek to serve as manager of the Bristol Bay Borough, was newly elected as a senator from a district which stretched as far north as Bettles and as far south as the Alaska Peninsula.  In the 1966 election, Hammond defeated Democratic incumbent Grant Pearson, who lived in Nenana,  from Naknek.  Under population-based apportionment, many future legislative districts in rural Alaska would also cover vast amounts of the state.

Senate

Senate members

Senate leadership
 President of the Senate – John Butrovich (R-Fairbanks)

Senate committee assignments
 Commerce
 Brady (chair), Harris (vice-chair), Koslosky, Waugaman, Christiansen
 Finance
 V. Phillips (chair), Haggland (vice-chair), Lewis, Brady, Smith, Engstrom, Blodgett
 Health, Welfare and Education
 Smith (chair), Thomas (vice-chair), Koslosky, Begich
 Judiciary
 Harris (chair), Ziegler (vice-chair), Waugaman, Hammond, Begich
 Labor and Management
 Thomas (chair), Palmer (vice-chair), Lewis, Bradshaw, Christiansen
 Local government
 Koslosky (chair), Lewis (vice-chair), Harris, Poland, Bradshaw
 Resources
 Hammond (chair), Waugaman (vice-chair), Palmer, Lewis, Blodgett
 Rules
 B. Phillips (chair), Ziegler (vice-chair), Haggland, Hammond, Smith
 State Affairs
 Engstrom (chair), Thomas (vice-chair), Haggland, Poland

House

House members

House leadership
 Speaker of the House – William K. Boardman (R-Ketchikan)
 House Majority Leader - Ted Stevens (R-Anchorage)

House committee assignments
 Commerce
 Young (chair), Powell (vice-chair), Beirne, Cessnun, Balone, Getman, Brady, Fink, Bradner
 Committee on Committees
 Boardman (chair), Stevens (vice-chair), Strandberg, Holm, Kerttula
 Finance
 Strandberg (chair), Haugen (vice-chair), Miller, Sackett, Sassara, Borer, Ray
 Health, Welfare and Education
 Banfield (chair), Fritz (vice-chair for health and welfare), Beirne (vice-chair for education), Wiggins, Metcalf, Moran, Wright, Young, Hohman
 Judiciary
 Fink (chair), Simpson (vice-chair), Tillion, Brady, Metcalf, Hensley, Moses, Fritz, Moran
 Labor and Management
 Wiggins (chair), Harris (vice-chair), Anderson, Simpson, See, McGill, Moore, Smith, Orbeck
 Local Government
 Smith (chair), Anderson (vice-chair), Beirne, Powell, Getman, Hohman, Harris, Simpson, Westdahl
 Resources
 Moses (chair), Anderson (vice-chair for mines and minerals), Moore (vice-chair for fish and game), Tillion, Cessnun, Wright, McGill, Holm, Powell, Hensley, See
 Rules
 Tillion (chair), Cessnun (vice-chair), Holm, Harris, Balone, Stevens, Kerttula
 State Affairs
 Holm (chair), Brady (vice-chair), Fritz, Moore, Guess, Bradner, Banfield, Wright, Orbeck

See also
 List of Alaska State Legislatures
 4th Alaska State Legislature, the legislature preceding this one
 6th Alaska State Legislature, the legislature following this one
 List of governors of Alaska
 List of speakers of the Alaska House of Representatives
 Alaska Legislature
 Alaska Senate
 {AKLeg.gov}

References
General
 
 

Specific and Notes

1967 establishments in Alaska
Alaska
1968 in Alaska
Alaska
1969 disestablishments in Alaska
05